The 1832 Missouri gubernatorial election was held on August 6, 1832.  Lt. Governor Daniel Dunklin, the Jacksonian candidate was elected over John Bull, the Anti-Jacksonian candidate.

Results

References

Missouri
1832
Gubernatorial
August 1832 events